Tahjib Alam Siddique is a Bangladesh Awami League politician and the incumbent Member of Parliament from Jhenaidah-2.

Early life
Siddique was born on 23 July 1975. He completed his Master's in Public Administration from a university in the United States. His father, Nur-E-Alam Siddique, was the President of Bangladesh Chhatra League and Independent Member of Parliament.

Career
Siddique was elected to Parliament on 5 January 2014 from Jhenaidah-2 as an independent candidate. He owns Doreen Power Limited, which has given the contract to build a power plant in Singair Upazila named Manikganj Power Generations Limited. The company has been accused of disrupting the flow of  Dhaleshwari River during construction of the power plant.

References

Awami League politicians
Living people
1975 births
10th Jatiya Sangsad members
11th Jatiya Sangsad members
Independent politicians in Bangladesh